Fort Ripley is a city in Crow Wing County, Minnesota, United States, near the confluence of the Mississippi and Nokasippi Rivers. The population was 69 at the 2010 census. It is part of the Brainerd Micropolitan Statistical Area.

History
Fort Ripley was a United States military installation beginning in 1849 and lasting until 1877. The fort, now Camp Ripley, was on the opposite side of the Mississippi River from Morrison County as the current city in Crow Wing County.

The city of Fort Ripley was incorporated in 1927. It took its name from the fort, which was named for Eleazer Wheelock Ripley, an American soldier and politician.

Geography

The city of Fort Ripley is geographically in Fort Ripley Township but is a separate entity. 

Fort Ripley is between Little Falls and Brainerd along Minnesota State Highway 371 near Over the Hill Road and Crow Wing County Road 2. The Mississippi River, the Nokasippi River, and the Little Nokasippi River are all in the vicinity.

The boundary line between Crow Wing and Morrison counties is nearby.

Demographics

2010 census
As of the census of 2010, there were 69 people, 33 households, and 20 families living in the city. The racial makeup of the city was 97.1% White, 1.4% Native American, and 1.4% Asian.

There were 33 households, of which 21.2% had children under the age of 18 living with them, 54.5% were married couples living together, 3.0% had a female householder with no husband present, 3.0% had a male householder with no wife present, and 39.4% were non-families. 33.3% of all households were made up of individuals, and 9.1% had someone living alone who was 65 years of age or older. The average household size was 2.09 and the average family size was 2.70.

The median age in the city was 50.5 years. 17.4% of residents were under the age of 18; 0.0% were between the ages of 18 and 24; 26% were from 25 to 44; 39.1% were from 45 to 64; and 17.4% were 65 years of age or older. The gender makeup of the city was 53.6% male and 46.4% female.

2000 census
As of the census of 2000, there were 74 people, 34 households, and 24 families living in the city. The racial makeup of the city was 94.59% White, 1.35% Native American, 1.35% from other races, and 2.70% from two or more races. Hispanic or Latino of any race were 4.05% of the population.

There were 34 households, out of which 11.8% had children under the age of 18 living with them, 61.8% were married couples living together, 2.9% had a female householder with no husband present, and 29.4% were non-families. 23.5% of all households were made up of individuals, and 5.9% had someone living alone who was 65 years of age or older. The average household size was 2.18 and the average family size was 2.46.

In the city, the population was spread out, with 9.5% under the age of 18, 8.1% from 18 to 24, 25.7% from 25 to 44, 44.6% from 45 to 64, and 12.2% who were 65 years of age or older. The median age was 48 years. For every 100 females, there were 124.2 males. For every 100 females age 18 and over, there were 123.3 males.

The median income for a household in the city was $37,250, and the median income for a family was $40,750. Males had a median income of $33,542 versus $26,250 for females. The per capita income for the city was $18,559. There were 11.1% of families and 6.8% of the population living below the poverty line, including no under eighteens and none of those over 64.

Education
Fort Ripley's students attend Brainerd Public Schools. The zoned high school is Brainerd High School.

References

Cities in Minnesota
Cities in Crow Wing County, Minnesota
Brainerd, Minnesota micropolitan area
Minnesota populated places on the Mississippi River
1927 establishments in Minnesota